Eucarphia resectella is a species of snout moth in the genus Eucarphia. It was described by Adolf Werneburg in 1865 from Germany.

Taxonomy
The generic placement and status of the species is unknown. The species has been overlooked since its original description. According to the original description, it could be a member of the genus Anerastia, possibly Anerastia lotella.

References

Moths described in 1865
Phycitini